In biology or medicine, a multi-access key is an identification key which overcomes the problem of the more traditional single-access keys (dichotomous or polytomous identification keys) of requiring a fixed sequence of identification steps. A multi-access key enables the user to freely choose the characteristics that are convenient to evaluate for the item to be identified. 

Although good single-access keys will try to start with characters that are reliable, convenient to observe and generally available throughout most of the year, it is often impossible to achieve this for all taxa in a key. A multi-access key lets the user adapt the key to the particular organism that is being identified and to the circumstances of identification (e.g. field or laboratory).

Multi-access keys may be printed in various way (tabular, matrix, formula style, etc.) but are more commonly used as computer-aided, interactive keys.

Alternative terms

Alternative terms used for multi-access keys are "random-access key", "multi-entry key", "polyclave", "matrix key", "tabular key", "synoptic key". Some of these terms should be avoided in this sense, however:

 "Multi-entry" keys allow the free choice of characters only in the first step, whereas in a typical multi-access key the choice of characters used for identification can be repeated multiple times (reducing the number of remaining taxa each time). The single step of selecting one or multiple criteria is followed by a dichotomous key for the species remaining after this step. 
 The terms "tabular key" and "matrix key" are best limited to a tabular presentation format of multi-access keys.
 The term "synoptic key" has an older definition, defining it as a key reflecting taxonomic classification and opposed to diagnostic keys arranged solely for the convenience of identification.

History

Interactive multi-access keys are a high-tech descendant of polyclaves ("card keys"). Historically various styles of encoding features of species (such as flower color) on punch cards were used. Holes or notches in these cards would allow the user to choose cards based on characters observed in a specimen until only one card remained, yielding a tentative identification.

Advantages 

Multi-access keys largely serve the same purpose as single-access (dichotomous or polytomous) keys, but have many advantages, especially in the form of computer-aided, interactive keys.  The user of an interactive key may select or enter information about an unidentified specimen in any order, allowing the computer to interactively rule out possible identifications of the entity and present the user with additional helpful information and guidance on what information to enter next.  Full-featured interactive keys may readily be equipped with images, audio, video, supplemental text, much-simplified language in conjunction with technical language and hyperlinks to assist the user with understanding of both entities and features.

Interactive keys remedy some of the problems outlined above.  The problem of language translations is made easier in interactive keys because characters and states frequently are simplified with less reliance on the intricate nuances of long strings of words.  The problem above where only one sex of an unknown specimen is at hand is mitigated because the user can simply use other characters.  The problem of not having a reliable and complete description to compare a specimen with is alleviated by full service interactive keys that include or link to such descriptions and authoritatively identified images.  The problem above about complete descriptions not being available in the field is also remedied if the interactive key is on a laptop or handheld computer.  With paper-based dichotomous keys the discovery of a new species renders the key incomplete; interactive keys are easily updated by adding information for newly discovered species and reposting computer files on the internet.

Many different computer programs for interactive keys are currently available, some of which are truly multi-access, and some not.

Examples
 WATTLE Acacias of Australia Lucid Web Player (multi-access key for identifying Australian Acacias)
Lucid multi-access key: Weeds of Australia Identification Tool. Queensland Government. (1021 species, 55 characters)
 Lucid Online Player - EUCLID Eucalypts of Australia (917 species/subspecies taxonomy as of December 2009.
Museum Victoria Delta keys to Squat Lobster Identification (require the Delta program to be downloaded)
Aquarium plants of the world (because they become environmental weeds in waterways)

References

Taxonomy (biology)